Indian Ocean is the debut album from Indian Ocean. The band’s first album, recorded in just 10 days at HMV’s Dumdum studio, Calcutta, in December 1992. Shaleen Sharma played the drums on this album. This is the only album in which Shaleen Sharma was present; later when Shaleen Sharma left the band he was replaced by Amit Kilam. Released on cassette initially and later on CD. This was a purely instrumental album with only a line or two sung by Asheem. It was a fluid album and defined the true sound of Indian Ocean before they became more of a pop band. A total of 30,000 copies were sold, but it has the potential for a release and perhaps an LP version for a justice to be done to the crisp sound. Recording engineer for this album was Raja Mukherjee. Cover concept was done by Manas Chakrabarti. The graphic design work was done by Navin Shiromani. The Durgapal family gave Indian Ocean all their time, patience and space while Indian Ocean prepared for this recording.

Track listing

1993 debut albums
Indian Ocean (band) albums